Exile's Gate is the seventh album by saxophonist Gary Thomas recorded in 1993 and released on the JMT label.

Reception
The AllMusic review by Thom Jurek states, "As a leader, saxophonist and composer Gary Thomas is wildly ambitious. Throughout the 1980s and into the '90s, Thomas experimented with everything from free jazz and funk to heavy metal and hip-hop. Exile's Gate is another such exercise... The first band plays Thomas' free-spirited and aggressive originals while the second plays standards for the most part. Only Thomas would think of putting the two approaches together on one record on alternate cuts."

Track listing
All compositions by Gary Thomas except as indicated
 "Exile's Gate" - 9:26   
 "Like Someone in Love" (Johnny Burke, Jimmy Van Heusen) - 9:01   
 "Kulture Bandits" - 7:19   
 "Blues on the Corner" (McCoy Tyner) - 8:00   
 "Night and Day" (Cole Porter) - 5:46   
 "No Mercy Rule" - 8:20
 "A Brilliant Madness" - 8:10

Personnel
Gary Thomas  - tenor saxophone
Paul Bollenback (tracks 1, 4 & 7), Marvin Sewell (tracks 2-3 & 5-6) - guitar
Charles Covington (tracks 1, 4 & 7), Tim Murphy (tracks: 2-3 & 5-6) - organ
Ed Howard - bass (tracks 2-3 & 5-6)
Jack DeJohnette (tracks 1, 4 & 7), Terri Lyne Carrington (tracks 2-3 & 5-6) - drums 
Steve Moss - percussion (track 6)

References 

1993 albums
Gary Thomas (musician) albums
JMT Records albums
Winter & Winter Records albums